Myrcia neoyaquensis is a species of flowering plant in the family Myrtaceae, native to the Dominican Republic.

References

neoyaquensis
Endemic flora of the Dominican Republic
Plants described in 2019